Dabin may refer to:
 Da-bin, Korean unisex given name
 Zuo Dabin, Chinese actress 
 Tan Dabin, a village in Talesh County, Gilan Province, Iran
 Dabin (music producer), a Canadian music producer
 Dabin, a former member of the boy group Touch

See also 
 Dabbing, a gesture